Aloma Mariam Mukhtar  (born 20 November 1944) is a Nigerian jurist and former Chief Justice of Nigeria from July 2012 to November 2014. She was called to the English Bar in November, 1966 and to the Nigerian Bar in 1967.

On 16 July 2012, President Goodluck Jonathan swore her in as the 13th indigenous Chief Justice of Nigeria, and conferred on her the Nigerian National Honour of the Grand Commander of the Order of the Niger (GCON).

Background
Mukhtar is from Adamawa state. She attended Saint. George’s Primary School, Zaria, St. Bartholomew’s School, Wusasa, Zaria, Rossholme School for Girls, East Brent, Somerset, England, Reading Technical College, Reading, Berkshire, England, and Gibson and Weldon College of Law, England, before being called to the English Bar in absentia in November, 1966.

Career
Mukhtar began her career in 1967 as Pupil State Counsel, Ministry of Justice, Northern Nigeria and rose through the ranks:
Office of the Legal Draftsman, Interim Common Services Agency, Magistrate Grade I, North Eastern State Government, 1971
Chief Registrar, Kano State Government Judiciary, 1973
Judge of the High Court of Kano State, 1977—1987
Justice of the Court of Appeal of Nigeria, Ibadan division, 1987—1993
Justice of the Supreme Court of Nigeria, 2005—2012
 Justice of the Supreme Court of The Gambia 2011-2012 
Chief Justice of Nigeria, 2012—2014

In her career, Mukhtar has been many firsts: she is the first female lawyer from Northern Nigeria, first female judge of the High Court in Kano State judiciary, the first female justice of the Court of Appeal of Nigeria, the first female justice of the Supreme Court of Nigeria (certain sources have erroneously given Roseline Ukeje this honor) and the first female Chief Justice of Nigeria.

Awards
During the course of her career she received several awards including the Nigerian national honor of Commander of the Order of Niger in 2006. Prior to that in 1993 she received a Gold Merit Award for her contribution in the development of law in Kano state and was also inducted into the Nigerian Hall of Fame in 2005.

See also 
 First women lawyers around the world

References 

1944 births
Living people
Supreme Court of Nigeria justices
Grand Commanders of the Order of the Niger
Chief justices of Nigeria
Women chief justices
Nigerian women jurists